Stoyan Abrashev (born 12 January 1988) is a Bulgarian footballer currently playing for FC Sportist Svoge as a midfielder.

External links 
 

1988 births
Living people
Bulgarian footballers
First Professional Football League (Bulgaria) players
Association football midfielders
PFC CSKA Sofia players
FC Dunav Ruse players
FC Sportist Svoge players